Freiman Peixoto (born 12 January 1984) is an Indian professional footballer who plays as a midfielder for Goa Professional League side Sporting Goa.

Career

Sporting Goa
During the summer of 2011 Peixoto signed with newly promoted Sporting Clube de Goa in the I-League. After the first half of the season Peixoto had made a huge impression not only on Sporting but on I-League as he was the leader in assists in league matches with 3 assists.

Salgaocar
He made his debut on 21 December 2013 against Bengaluru FC at the Bangalore Football Stadium in which he came on as a substitute for Clifton Dias in the 74th minute as Salgaocar lost the match 2-1.

References

External links 
. Soccerway Profile

Indian footballers
1984 births
Living people
Footballers from Goa
Association football midfielders
I-League players
Sporting Clube de Goa players
Salgaocar FC players